The National Weather Service Binghamton, New York is a local office of the National Weather Service responsible for monitoring weather conditions 17 counties in New York and 7 counties in Pennsylvania including the cities of Binghamton, Elmira, Ithaca, Rome, Sayre, Scranton, Syracuse, Utica, and Wilkes-Barre.

NOAA Weather Radio
The National Weather Service Binghamton, New York forecast office provides programming for 13 NOAA Weather Radio stations in New York and New Hampshire.

External links
 NWS Binghamton's website

References

Binghamtom, New York
Binghamton, New York